John Skinner may refer to:

Politicians
John Skinner (MP for Maldon), 1391–1393, MP for Maldon 1391 and 1393
John Skinner (fl.1395-99), MP for Reigate 1395, 1397 and 1399
John Skinner (fl.1414-20), MP for Reigate 1414, 1415 and 1420
John Skinner (MP for Hythe), MP for Hythe 1419, 1423, 1425 and 1427
John Skinner (died ?1543) (died 1543), MP for Reigate in 1529
John Skinner (died 1571), MP for Reigate and Surrey
John Skinner (died 1584) (1535–1584), MP for Reigate 1559 and 1572

Others
John Skinner (early settler) (1590–1650), early Puritan settler in the Massachusetts Bay Colony
John Skinner (poet) (1721–1807), Scottish historian and songwriter
John Skinner (bishop) (1744–1816), bishop of Aberdeen and Orkney
John Skinner (archaeologist) (1772–1839), English parish vicar and amateur antiquarian and archaeologist
John Skinner (cricketer) (1850–1926), English cricketer
John Edwin Hilary Skinner (1839–1894), English war correspondent
John Kendrick Skinner (1883–1918), Scottish recipient of the Victoria Cross
John Stuart Skinner (1788–1851), American lawyer, publisher, and editor
John W. Skinner (1890–1955), headmaster of Culford School, 1924–1951
John O. Skinner (1845–1932), American physician and Medal of Honor recipient